The Marilyn Monroe portfolio is a portfolio or series of ten 36×36 inch silkscreened prints on paper by the pop artist Andy Warhol, first made in 1967, all showing the same image of the 1950s film star Marilyn Monroe but all in different, mostly very bright, colors.  They were made five years after her death in 1962. The original image was taken by Warhol from a promotional still by Gene Kornman  for Monroe's film Niagara (1953). 

Soon after her death, Warhol had used the same image in a screenprint painting, Gold Marilyn Monroe, and fifty repetitions of it in his Marilyn Diptych; both are on canvas and have painted and printed elements.  There was also an "announcement" print for the later series, a yellow, green and pink Marilyn, which lacked borders and was much smaller than the rest, with the image 6 inches square. The portfolio of ten was printed in an edition of 250, some signed by Warhol.

Whilst the portfolio is viewed as one entity, each individual print may either be called Untitled from Marilyn Monroe or named after the colors in the work, as for example Orange Marilyn, Lemon Marilyn, and White Marilyn.  After the first prints were made in 1967, they were sold by Warhol for as little as $250. However, with his rise in fame, in 1998 Orange Marilyn sold for $17.3 million and more recently, the White Marilyn sold for $41 million.

History/influences 
Prior to his success as an artist, Warhol used his degree in pictorial design to be employed as a commercial illustrator in New York City, producing advertisements for Glamour fashion magazine whilst exhibiting his work on a small scale. Warhol soon gained popularity as a commercial artist advertising for prestigious magazines such as New York Times, Vogue and Harper's Bazaar. This exposed him to a circle of many popular figures and encouraged his fascination with celebrities that began when he was a young boy. Whilst he strictly kept his business and personal art pieces separate, his audience-orientated day-job provided him with a backing to manipulate the public's views in Untitled from Marilyn Monroe. In which he immortalises the actress after her death and advertises the star and her fame through her public self. The separation between his art is clear as his commercial work of the 1940-50s period is much lighter due to the addition of ink by hand to drawn images to be then pressed onto a blank surface so the wet lines transfer. Such primitive printing technique exposed Warhol to his later appreciation of flawed repetition.

Although much influenced by Jasper Johns and Robert Rauschenberg, pioneers of the Neo-Dada movement, Warhol embodied the colourful and bold pop-art as the basis of his work, and as a rejection of Jackson Pollock's and Willem de Kooning's abstract expressionism. Pop Art allowed Warhol to challenge the need for originality in art, rather preferring to use photographs as the basis of his work. Instead of focusing on emotion and dramatic action, Pop Art sought to represent the dynamics of the world and be inclusive of the state of objects and society in everyday life. This in combination with mass media production, inspired Warhol's future use of automatic reproduction through silk screening. This technique was employed Warhol at a perfect time when America's gross national products quadrupled in 1960's creating an economy based on consumerism. Referring to the slight disturbances to the uniformity of silk screened prints, Warhol said, "I liked the way repetition changes the same image", demonstrating this transformations in the 10 Monroe prints, characteristic of the ink messy process.

His apparently random assortment of subjects, is a "careful selection through elimination", of public events or famous figures which convey historic, popular and meaningful connotations. These distinct artistic choices, catalysed his success and recognition, defining him as an artist through these headlined events whilst simultaneously creating an anthology of art pieces that reflect his time. Such endurance was important to Warhol, "the idea is not to live forever, it is to create something that will". He was successful in this mission by creating a legacy for himself as a pioneer of Pop Art as well as immortalising the subjects of his work.

Marilyn Monroe 

Monroe began as a model under her real name Norma Jean Baker. After being scouted whilst working at a military factory, her pale features and blonde hair gained wide recognition and she signed a seven-year contract with Twentieth Century Fox. She appeared in 30 films and was one of the top paid actresses in the 1950s. Her film credits included The Asphalt Jungle, All about Eve and The Seven Year Itch. During this time Niagara (1953) was released. A promotional still from the film and captured by Gene Kornman is the basis of Untitled from Marilyn Monroe. However, Monroe often struggled with casting in serious movie roles, due to Hollywood's depiction of her as a vacant and sexualised woman. She died of an overdose on August 4, 1962.

Analysis 
As a pioneer of the Pop Art movement endorsing pop culture and materialism, Warhol rejects Abstract Expressionism celebrating independent art that holds true to consumeristic aesthetic. This was done through borrowing by Warhol from a promotional still of the film Niagara (1953), raising questions on the extent of artistic appropriation.

In Untitled from Marilyn Monroe, Warhol deconstructs a film star and her artificial media typecast. Warhol transformed Monroe's ubiquitous typecast as an enduring sex icon and femme fatale into a creative silkscreened print. The borrowing by Warhol from a promotional still raises questions on the extent of artistic appropriation. This objectification of Monroe was possible in a society which valued products and brands over people. His minimal use of detail and heavy outlines exaggerated and maintained Monroe's striking facial features and her sculpted hair through the colourful repetitions, which suggest more to the artwork and the concept of cyclic history. The original still was also cropped by Warhol to bring Monroe's iconic features into focus to exhibit her social status and portray her as being closer to the audience. The detached nature of, and the minor changes among, the ten prints, attributable to the imperfections, smudges and blurriness from the silkscreen technique, emphasise the disconnect between the public and the private Monroe. These small imperfections can also be viewed as Warhol's comment on the rise of mass production in the 1960s.

Warhol challenged popular press who chose to expose Monroe's private life through media, by rather featuring her public identity through an art form that closely resembled print media. Monroe strived to keep her privacy, "I don't want everybody to see exactly where I live, what my sofa or fireplace looks like... I want to stay just in the fantasy of Everyman".  Warhol paid tribute to her desires through the prints which drive attention away from her private moments and close in on her beauty and her role as a model and an actress.

Warhol's attraction to catastrophic events for use as subject matter is clear in his choice of Monroe as a subject closely after her death in 1962. The event was considered an American tragedy.

Technique 
Warhol's style evolved over his career, becoming bolder and more graphic. In 1962, he adopted what would become his trademark, the screen printing technique that defined his works. Warhol said, "I started doing silk-screens. I wanted something stronger that gave more of an assembly-line affect".

Mass replicating images, which attracted him to silk screening, was a precursor to laser printing. Warhol would first mark the surface according to where the colours are to be laid, as silk screening involves the layering of inks, one at a time, using a different frame. He would then place a silk mesh screen on the original and saturate the screen with coloured ink and emulsion using a squeegee. The saturated screen would then be placed on the surface of the print and this process would be repeated for each block of colour. For Untitled from Marilyn Monroe, Warhol used five different mesh screens for each print.

Gerard Malanga 

Prior to working as Warhol's screen-printing assistant, Gerard Malanga grew up in the Bronx to a very traditional family. Much like Warhol, he studied Graphic and Advertising Design but found more of his passion in poetry which he later came to realise was difficult in bringing financial wealth. Gerard was able to meet Warhol through a mutual poetry friend in 1962, three years after graduating. At the time Gerard did not know who Warhol was and had very little regard for him, "I was more interested in the poets", however, what he thought was a summer job at an art factory lasted 7 years. For the production of larger works such as Untitled from Marilyn Monroe, Warhol hired 20-year-old Gerard Malanga to aid in him in The Factory between 1963 and 1967, the name being an allegory for his mass production of art. This decision was made based on Malanga's expertise in screen printing, which Warhol lacked at the time, especially with works of larger scale requiring the use of very large screens.

Use of color 
Famous for his use of vibrant and bold color, Warhol utilised non-symbolic colors described by himself as "artificial" in Untitled from Marilyn Monroe. This classification was due to the lack of representation for the colors of the real-life objects. When asked if he ever tried realism in his art, he simply replied, "Gee, I don't know how to". It was this technique of complementary color assortment, colors found on the opposite sides of the color wheel, which played a part in Warhol's rise to fame. They did so through connotation of the bright, hard-edged colors to the pop-culture aesthetic of that highly commercial and consumeristic period. Each color variation embodies its own tone and mood allowing Warhol to communicate the importance of color in display of emotion even if the subject matter remains the same.

Critical and commercial reception 
The cropped and ultimately untouched images have since been recognised as iconic and influential on contemporary art forming the foundations of what is now known as Pop Art. The impact of him pioneering this movement was in his ability to break down the separation between high-class art such as historic and expressionist, and low-class art, such as commercial and the more mundane. The endurance of the works and the growth in price is attributed to the fact that Warhol's art is still relevant and reflective of today's glamour and the consumer culture.

After the first prints were made in 1962, they were sold by Warhol for as little as $250. However, with his rise in fame, in 1998 Orange Marilyn sold for $17.3 million and more recently, the White Marilyn sold for $41 million. Whilst the original silk-screened prints made by hand are worth millions, due to the iconic nature of this work, computer-printed "Marilyns" is also sold for a much lesser price.

References 

Art by Andy Warhol
20th-century prints
Works about Marilyn Monroe
1967 works